The Grand Democratic Alliance is a regionalist political alliance based in Sindh, Pakistan. It was founded on 23 October 2017 as a movement against the Pakistan Peoples Party (PPP) government in Sindh, accusing it of poor governance, fascism and corruption. The alliance claims that the people of Sindh are unhappy with the PPP government. It currently has 14 seats in the Provincial Assembly of Sindh and 3 seats in the National Assembly of Pakistan.

History 
On 23 October 2017, Grand Democratic Alliance was formed in Sindh, Pakistan. On 26 November 2017, the leaders of the GDA participated in GDA's first official meeting to be held in Sukkur on November 26. The alliance was formed to defeat the Pakistan Peoples Party (PPP) in the Sindh province, which is considered a stronghold of the PPP. The alliance has been seen as a major challenger to the PPP in the 2018 elections.

2018 general elections 
For the 2018 Pakistani general election, the GDA joined hands with the Pakistan Tehreek-e-Insaf by forming seat adjustments in more than ten seats with the aim of defeating the PPP. As a result of the election, the GDA won 14 seats in the Provincial Assembly of Sindh, 3 seats in the National Assembly and garnered almost 15% of the vote in Sindh.

Parties
The following individuals and political parties are part of the GDA:

Parties joining later

Initial parties

Former parties

References 

2017 establishments in Pakistan
Political party alliances in Pakistan
Political parties established in 2017